Independent Nation: Should Wales Leave the UK? is a book about Welsh independence by journalist Will Hayward.

About 
The book discusses the country's feelings about Welsh independence and aims to improve the quality of the debate about it. Hayward says, "[T]he idea of the book is two ­different people could read this book and they could come to a different conclusion based on their attitude to risk, their income and whereabouts they live in Wales."

The book discusses major talking points surrounding Welsh independence which includes;

 Can Wales afford it?
 EU membership
 Pensions and the national debt
 The likelihood of Welsh independence
 How would the referendum work?
 Why people want independence
 Could Wales sell electricity to England?

In a review for the Institute of Welsh Affairs, Glyndwr Jones  describes the book as an impartial, well-informed and enjoyable read which objectively examines the truth and false of the Welsh independence debate. The West Lothian question is raised about the lack of an English parliament for England only. The book also mentions the poor decisions of the UK government which include:

 An absence of a Barnett consequential for Wales and Scotland after the DUP deal which involved £1 billion for Northern Ireland
 The negative impact of the United Kingdom Internal Market Act 2020 on Welsh devolution
 Classing HS2 as an "England and Wales" project despite no track in Wales at all, meaning Wales loses out on £5 billion

The book notes the fractured relationship between the UK and Welsh governments and discusses both supportive and opposing views of Welsh independence. Hayward discusses currency, EU, and energy generation among other factors and Hayward concludes, "I could be convinced, but am not yet".

Journalist Ifan Morgan Jones says that the book is likely to make a significant impact on the debate surrounding an independent Wales and uses a matter of fact style with informative constructive advice. Huw Edwards notes in the foreword of the book that there hasn't been much discussion about the details of independence. The strengths of the book include the wealth of interview research with lesser aspects including some lack of discussion about identity and nationalism and the importance of a strong national media industry.

Hayward was surprised during research for his book at how many people supported Welsh independence to achieve EU membership, but also added that this was not a "majority factor".

On 7 December 2022, Hayward discussed his book alongside Gerry Hassan to discuss his book Scotland Rising: The Case for Independence. They appeared at the City Arms in Cardiff in a collaboration between Hiraeth Podcast and the Wales Governance Centre of Cardiff University for an informed political debate.

"Not a penny less" controversy 
During their 2019 general election campaign, the Tories promised the people of Wales that Wales would get "not a penny less" after Brexit. Hayward says that the Tories broke this promise to Wales. With regards to the UK government's access to previously, EU allocated funding to the Welsh government, Boris Johnson is quoted in the book as saying "We want to control that, don’t we?’", to which Welsh Tory Alun Cairns agrees. Hayward says that this shows a lack of respect for devolution and an assumption that "Westminster knows best" as the funds were previously allocated to the Welsh government by the EU.

References 

Welsh non-fiction books
2022 non-fiction books